Agarabi Rural LLG is a local-level government (LLG) of Eastern Highlands Province, Papua New Guinea. The Agarabi language is spoken in the LLG.

Wards
01. Ramu
02. Onkono
03. Aubana
04. Pakino
05. Anonapa
06. Akuitenu
07. Anawa-Yonki
08. Yonki No. 1

References

Local-level governments of Eastern Highlands Province